Capital Tower can refer to:
World Capital Tower, Jakarta
Capital Tower (Amman, Jordan)
Capital Tower, Singapore
Capital Tower, Cardiff
Capital Gate, in Abu Dhabi
 Capital Towers (Moscow), Moscow
Capital Towers (London), London

See also
Capitol Records Tower